Nuri (also spelled Nouri, Noori, Nori  or Noory) is a name which may refer to:

Given name
 Nuri Ja'far (1914 –  1991), Iraqi psychologist and philosopher of education
 NOURI (artist) (born 1993), New Zealand recording artist of Kurdish descent
Nuri Badran (born 1943), Iraqi politician
Nuri Bengali (died 1785), Sufi scholar and author
Nuri Berköz (1889–1975), Azerbaijani general
Nuri Boytorun (1908–1988), Turkish wrestler
Nuri Bilge Ceylan (born 1959), Turkish filmmaker
Nuri Demirağ (1886–1957), Turkish industrialist
Nuri Killigil (1881–1949), general in the Ottoman army
Nuri Kino (born 1965), Swedish journalist and filmmaker
Nouri al-Maliki (born 1950), Prime Minister of Iraq
Nuri Montsé (1917–1971), Argentine actress
Nuri Ok (1942–2015), Turkish judge
Nouri Ouznadji (born 1984), Algerian footballer
Nuri as-Said (1888–1958), Iraqi politician
Nuri Sojliu (1870–1940), signatory of the Albanian Declaration of Independence
Nuri Şahin (born 1988), Turkish footballer
Nuri Şahin (volleyball player) (born 1980), Turkish volleyball player

Surname
 Abdelhak Nouri (born 1997), Dutch footballer
 Abdollah Nouri, Iranian politician
 Alekhine Nouri, Filipino chess master
 Alexander Nouri (born 1979), Iranian-German football manager
 Ali Akbar Nategh-Nouri, Iranian politician
 Alireza Noori, Iranian politician
 George Noory, radio talk show host
 Hossein Nuri, Iranian painter, dramaturge, and filmmaker
 Kat Nouri, Iranian-born American entrepreneur and inventor
 Michael Nouri, Lebanese-American actor
 Mina Nouri (born 1951), Iranian painter
 Mohammad Nouri (footballer), Iranian footballer
 Mohammad Nouri (singer), Iranian singer
 Milad Nouri (footballer born 1986), Iranian footballer
 Pejman Nouri, Iranian footballer
 Pir Syed Muhammad Channan Shah Nuri, Islamic saint
 Sayid Abdulloh Nuri (1947–2006), leader of the Islamic Renaissance Party of Tajikistan
 Shahab Sheikh Nuri (1932–1976), Kurdish politician
 Sheikh Fazlollah Noori, Iranian cleric
 Süleyman Nuri (1895–1966), Ottoman Russian communist politician
 Vahid Nouri (born 1989), Iranian paralympic judoka
 Yochanan ben Nuri, Tanna of the first and second century CE

Middle name
 Hossein Noori Hamedani, Iranian ayatollah

See also
Nuri (disambiguation)

Arabic-language surnames
Arabic masculine given names
Turkish masculine given names
Korean unisex given names